Arthur "Art" Cua Yap (born November 10, 1965) is a Filipino politician who is the former governor of Bohol from 2019 to 2022. He was the secretary of the Department of Agriculture under the Arroyo administration from 2004 to 2005 and from 2006 to 2007. He became a member of the House of Representatives of the Philippines, representing the 3rd District of Bohol from 2010 to 2019.

Early life and education
Yap was born on November 10, 1965 in Manila. He is the eldest among the three children of Domingo Yap and Natividad Cua. His father was born in Jolo, Sulu and is of Chinese-Tausug descent while his mother was from Dagupan, Pangasinan.

For his elementary and high school education, Yap studied at Xavier School from 1973 to 1983. He went to Ateneo de Manila University for college and graduated in 1987 with a degree in Management Economics. He was a Dean’s lister during this time and had Gloria Macapagal Arroyo as his economics professor. He then went to the Ateneo de Manila University School of Law for his Juris Doctor's degree. He was admitted to the Philippine Bar in 1992.

Career 
While studying, Yap was recruited by his professor to join the Balane, Barican, Cruz, Alampay Law Office. He worked there for about two years. After being admitted to the bar, he was recommended by Fr. Joaquin Bernas to join the law office of former Associate Justice Adolfo Azcuna. Because of that, he became an associate lawyer of the Azcuna, Yorac, Sarmiento, Arroyo, Cua Law Office.

In the late 1990s, Yap co-founded the Ejercito-Yap-Butchong Law Office. He was affiliated also with the Yap, Jacinto, Jacob Law Office as Co-Founding Partner. He was once the National President of the Philippine Association of Paint Manufacturers.

Yap first entered government service in August 2001 as President and CEO of the Philippine International Trading Corporation under the Department of Trade and Industry. Thereafter, he served as the Administrator of the National Food Authority for two years and as Agriculture Undersecretary for Luzon Operations, after which was a brief stint as the Secretary of Agriculture. He was one of the youngest to be appointed to the Cabinet of President Gloria Macapagal Arroyo. He was also designated as the Development Champion for the North Luzon Agribusiness Quadrangle (NLAQ). He then left the post in July 2005 to give way to Domingo Panganiban.

In December 2005, he became Presidential Adviser for Job Creation. He then became the 15th Director General of the Presidential Management Staff, the fifth post he had been designated to in the Arroyo administration. He was appointed again as Agriculture Secretary in 2006. He resigned from his position in February 2010 to run as a member of the House of Representatives.

From 2010 to 2019, Yap was a congressman representing the third district of Bohol. While there, he held various positions such as being assistant minority leader of the Committee on Rules, vice-chairman of the Committees on Globalization And WTO, Government Enterprises And Privatization, and Ecology, chairman of the Committees on Reforestation and Economic Affairs, and being the deputy speaker from 2018 to 2019.

During the 2019 Philippine gubernatorial elections, Yap ran for governor of Bohol under PDP–Laban, the party of President Rodrigo Duterte. His opponents included former Cabinet Secretary Leoncio Evasco. Yap won by a slim margin of 2,161 votes garnering 326,895 votes against Evasco’s 324,734. He took his oath on June 30, 2019, officially becoming Bohol's 26th governor.

Personal life 
Yap is married to Carolyne Varquez-Gow, a native of Loboc, Bohol. Together they have 2 children.

References

|-

|-

|-

1965 births
Living people
People from Manila
Governors of Bohol
Members of the House of Representatives of the Philippines from Bohol
Secretaries of Agriculture of the Philippines
Advisers to the President of the Philippines
Heads of the Presidential Management Staff of the Philippines
Lakas–CMD politicians
PDP–Laban politicians
Ateneo de Manila University alumni
Arroyo administration cabinet members
Filipino politicians of Chinese descent
Deputy Speakers of the House of Representatives of the Philippines
Grand Crosses of the Order of Lakandula